HealthInvestor is a monthly magazine and website produced by Investor Publishing Limited, London.

It covers the private hospital market and independent NHS providers in the UK.  It carries company results and runs an Index of the prices of UK healthcare companies traded on the London Stock Exchange, the Alternative Investment Market and PLUS Markets.  According to the British Healthcare Trades Association it is the UK healthcare industry's most respected information source.

Since 2006 it has organised annual awards for leaders in the private healthcare sector, and legal advisers. The 2015 event was attended by over 1,300 professionals in the industry.  The 2016 event was held at London's Grosvenor House Hotel. HealthInvestor now organises six events nationally and in 2019 is hosting a conference in Chicago for US investors interesting in the UK healthcare market.

HealthInvestor UK is edited by Rob Munro.

References

Medical magazines
Business magazines published in the United Kingdom